Komintern is a rural locality (a settlement) and the administrative center of Kominternovsky Selsoviet of Volchikhinsky District, Altai Krai, Russia. The population was 401 as of 2016. It was founded in 1929. There are 6 streets.

Geography 
Komintern is located 29 km north of Volchikha (the district's administrative centre) by road. Pyatkov Log is the nearest rural locality.

References 

Rural localities in Volchikhinsky District